El Cajon may refer to:
 El Cajon, California, United States
 El Cajón, Catamarca, Argentina
 Rancho El Cajon, a Mexican land grant in modern-day California, United States

See also 
 Cajón, a musical instrument
 Cajon Canyon, in California, United States
 Cajon Pass, in California, United States
 El Cajon Boulevard, in California, United States
 El Cajón Dam (disambiguation)
 El Cajon Formation, in Mexico
 El Cajon Mountain, in California, United States